George James John Honochick (August 19, 1917 – March 10, 1994) was an American professional baseball umpire, whose career in Major League Baseball (MLB) began in  and ended in . During that span, Honochick officiated in six World Series and four All-Star games. He also called balls and strikes for three no-hitters: the first of Virgil Trucks' two, Jack Kralick, and Sonny Siebert.

Early life and education
Born in Oneida, Pennsylvania, and raised in Allentown, Honochick graduated from Allentown Central Catholic High School. He played football and baseball at Temple University in Philadelphia and minor league baseball for three seasons in the International League with the Baltimore Orioles. Honochick was an umpire in the IL prior to his promotion to the majors in March 1949.

Career
Honochick was the crew chief who declared that the Washington Senators forfeit its last game (played at home at RFK Stadium in Washington, D.C. on September 30) because a mob, furious that the franchise was relocating to the Dallas–Fort Worth metroplex the next season, stormed the playing field with the team only one out away from victory.

During the mid-1970s, Honochick was one of the many professional sports-related celebrities who became spokespeople for Lite Beer from Miller. His first commercial played up the clichéd notion, usually bellowed out by hecklers, that umpires should get glasses because of questionable calls made on the field having been caused by poor eyesight. In it, he helped to promote the product without realizing who the other pitchman in the ad was. After putting on spectacles, he immediately noticed who it was, exclaiming, "Hey! You're Boog Powell!" This theme continued to be used in subsequent Miller Lite spots.

References

External links
Career statistics and umpire information from The Baseball Cube, or Retrosheet
Jim Honochick at SABR (Baseball BioProject)

Jim Honochick Obituary at Morning Call Newspapers, by Keith Groller
Jim Honochick Oral History Interview (1 of 3) - National Baseball Hall of Fame Digital Collection
Jim Honochick Oral History Interview (2 of 3) - National Baseball Hall of Fame Digital Collection
Jim Honochick Oral History Interview (3 of 3) - National Baseball Hall of Fame Digital Collection

1917 births
1994 deaths
Allentown Central Catholic High School alumni
Major League Baseball umpires
People from Schuylkill County, Pennsylvania
Baseball players from Pennsylvania
Baltimore Orioles (IL) players
Temple Owls football players
Temple Owls baseball players